Futaleufú is a Chilean town and commune located in Northern Patagonia. Located at the confluence of the Espolon and Futaleufú river valleys, the town is approximately 10 kilometers from the Argentinian border. Futaleufú is the provincial capital of Palena Province, Los Lagos Region. Futaleufú, known locally as “Futa,” is a frontier town with a growing tourism industry based on adventure tourism—most specifically whitewater rafting—but also fishing, mountain biking, trekking, and canyoning. Due to its proximity to the Argentinian border, Futaleufú is most easily accessed from airports in Esquel and Bariloche, Argentina. Other tourists access the town through the Northern Patagonia Airport in Chaiten, or vía a system of ferries that leave from the closest major Chilean city,  Puerto Montt.

The town is named after the crystal blue Futaleufú River, widely considered to be one of the best whitewater rafting rivers in the world. The name Futaleufu derives from a Mapudungun word meaning "Big River".

The town has a population of about 2,000, growing slightly during the summer rafting and kayaking season. The main income for the community is whitewater kayaking and rafting, together with fly fishing and other associated outdoor sports. Many original residents raise sheep, cattle and practice small scale subsistence  farming.  A gravel road links the town to Trevelin in Argentina and to the Carretera Austral. It is served by Futaleufú Airfield.

Following the eruption of Chaitén Volcano and the subsequent destruction of Chaitén, Futaleufú has been the administrative capital of Palena Province since March 2009.

Climate
Futaleufú has an oceanic climate (Köppen climate classification Cfb) with some drying trend in summer. Few days are dry in winter, since there are 18–19 days with measurable precipitation from June to August. Snowfalls occur in most years though prolonged snowfall events are uncommon. However, precipitation during the summer months are highly variable; in some years, many days can go without a day of precipitation such as the case in 1987 when only  of precipitation was recorded in January while in other years, some monthly precipitation can exceed  such as in January 1974. Temperatures can occasionally exceed  any time between September and May.

Demographics
Of these, 1,153 (63.1%) lived in urban areas and 673 (36.9%) in rural areas. The population grew by 5.2% (91 persons) between the 1992 and 2002 censuses.

As a border town, many families are of mixed Chilean and Argentinian heritage. Tourism is also changing the demographic composition of Futaleufú as young families from Santiago, Argentina, Brazil, Western Europe and North America have immigrated in recent years.

Administration
As a commune, Futaleufú is a third-level administrative division of Chile administered by a municipal council and led by an alcalde who is directly elected every four years. Since 2018, the alcalde has been Fernando Grandón Domke. 
 
Within the electoral divisions of Chile, Futaleufú is represented in the Chamber of Deputies by Gabriel Ascencio (PDC) and Alejandro Santana (RN) as part of the 58th electoral district together with Castro, Ancud, Quemchi, Dalcahue, Curaco de Vélez, Quinchao, Puqueldón, Chonchi, Queilén, Quellón, Chaitén, Hualaihué and Palena. The commune is represented in the Senate by Rabindranath Quinteros (PS) and Iván Moreira (UDI), as part of the 17th senatorial constituency (Los Lagos Region).

Landscape and attractions

The Futaleufú River is commonly rated by specialized media as one of the best rivers in the world for kayaking and rafting,. The river flows in from Argentina, through the town, and empties into the fjord-shaped Yelcho Lake. Day trips and multi-day trips are available on "the Futa" while several of its tributaries, such as the Espolón River, Rio Chico, and the Azul (Blue) River, can be rafted, canoed, or navigated by boat.
 
Lonconao Lake, which is fed by aquifers and not glaciers, is best for swimming and water sports. Yelcho and Espolón Lakes are larger, glacially fed, and offer world class fly fishing.  Both larger lakes feature remote landscapes such as waterfalls, remote bays, and old growth forests which are inaccessible by road, so boating and kayaking are highly recommended. Fly fishing is also possible on the Futaleufú River, the Rio Chico, the Yelcho River (the largest river in the Futaleufú Valley) and Espolon River, which is the largest tributary of the Futaleufú and contains brown trout and rainbow trout, as well as salmon in April and May.

Other nearby attractions include the Futaleufú National Reserve, known for its population of Huemul (South Andean deer), Queulat National Park, and Pumalín Park. Pumalin was once Chile's largest private nature reserve, but has since been absorbed by the national park system and renamed to honor its founder, American environmentalist and founder of The North Face, Douglas Tompkins.

Queulat is one of Chile's most dramatic national parks famous for its hanging glacier and diverse old growth rain forests. Pumalin, now renamed Douglas Tompkins Pumalín National Park, is a diverse and massive reserve with an extensive infrastructure of trails, campgrounds, and visitor centres.

La Hoya, an Argentinian ski resort with 2000 feet of vertical drop and one of the longest ski seasons in South America, is a 70-minute drive from Futaleufú. Another attraction across the Argentinian border is Los Alerces National Park, a UNESCO protected reserve which features the Futaleufu River headwaters and one of the oldest Alerce forests in the world, with trees up to 2,600 years old.
 
Canyoning and rappelling is also possible in the Futaleufú valley, with its numerous ravines and waterfalls, as well as horse riding and mountain biking.

References

External links 
  Municipality of Futaleufú
 

Communes of Chile
Populated places in Palena Province